At 210 metres, Duncliffe Hill is one of the highest hills in the Blackmore Vale region in the county of Dorset, England.

Location 
Duncliffe Hill rises from the surrounding lowland about 2 miles west of Shaftesbury in the Blackmore Vale and is visible miles away in Wiltshire and Somerset. It is a flattened, conical hill, however there is no evidence of volcanic activity or weathering erosion that would explain its formation. It is most likely an artificial conical hill created by the Durotriges tribe. The slopes are covered by Duncliffe Wood on three sides, but  are open to the north. There are several trails through the woods, some leading to the summit where there is a trig point. The wood is a bird reserve. The A30 main road passes by the foot of the hill to the north.

References 

Hills of Dorset